Ilie Popa may refer to:
Ilie Popa (racewalker), Romanian racewalker
Ilie Popa (mathematician) (1907–1983), Romanian mathematician